Sadie Kuttner Epstein (1883 - May 28, 1973) was an American concert singer.

Personal life
Sadie Kuttner was born in Cincinnati in 1883, the daughter of Simon H. Kuttner (1853-1940) and Pauline Grunauer (1850-1913). She moved to St. Louis in 1900, at which time she entered the Beethoven Conservatory, where she took a course of music under A. I. Epstein, who later became her husband. 

She early showed musical talent, taking up the study of the piano as a child. She was gifted by nature with a splendid voice, and could not remember a time when she did not sing.

Career
Sadie Kuttner Epstein had a crystal clear soprano voice with a fullness of tone, richness of color, and emotional expression that invariably captures her audiences. Hers might be an international reputation did she not choose a domestic life in preference to an acceptance of the many flattering offers made by Eastern managers. The warmth and grace of her temperament, added to the skilled cultivation of her musicianship, placed her in the foremost rank of singers. 

Since her appearance on the concert stage Epstein sang with the most prominent singing societies in St. Louis and elsewhere, engagements taking her as far north as Winnipeg, Canada, and east as far as Pittsburgh. With many of the societies she was called to take part in oratorios. Her repertoire included the soprano roles in George Frideric Handel's Hiawatha, Giuseppe Verdi's Requiem, Franz Liszt's Elizabeth of Hungary, Max Bruch's Die Schone Helene, Robert Schumann's Paradise and the Peri, and many others. 

Epstein had the linguistic ability to interpret her song in three languages. Incessant study, determination and ambition placed her 
in the high position which she occupied. 

There were few concert singers before the public in the 1910s who could render such long and varied lists of song as Epstein. From the point of view of vocalization alone her success was great, and as to interpretation her range of intelligence and feeling was inexhaustive. Epstein had very flattering offers from Eastern concert leaders, but she realized that she could not be the happy wife and mother that she was and lead a life such as would be required of a member of an opera troupe at the same time. 

Without any hesitation or regret she refused offer after offer. Her work with the St. Louis Symphony Society was a great triumph. For the first time in many years a singer from this city was chosen to appear as soloist at the regular concerts. 

During the Louisiana Purchase Exposition she was engaged by the Scranton Oratorio Society of Scranton, Pennsylvania, to sing the soprano role in Felix Mendelssohn's Oratorio, Elijah, at the concert given by them in Festival Hall in 1904. Epstein was the only St. Louis singer engaged for the concerts given during the fair, most of them coming from Chicago and New York. The soprano role in Elijah was a difficult one, which she rendered amazingly well. 

Many unique programmes were rendered by Epstein in connection with Mrs. C. B. Rohland's lecture recitals, and unquestionably some of the most difficult and interesting works of the old and modern composers were presented by these two artists. Compositions by Jean Sibelius, Johann Strauss I, Claude Debussy, Christian Wolff, Pyotr Ilyich Tchaikovsky, Mily Balakirev, Anton Rubinstein, Alexander Borodin, Mikhail Glinka, Bachmetieff, Modest Mussorgsky, Alexander Dargomyzhsky, were presented to the public, and beauties of these works brought out in masterly style. Epstein was the first singer in America to give an entire recital of the works of Sibelius, the great Finnish composer. The two women prepared a pretentious programme of modern Italian music given in various cities during the season of 1913–14. Rohland was a recognized authority on musical data and was closely identified with the development of music in St. Louis. Her lectures were excellently prepared, instructive, and her sympathetic artistic accompaniments on the piano a great help to the singer. She was the director of the new Choral Society which was organized in St. Louis for singers only, the object of the club being to do strictly choral work. Rohland was a resident of Alton, Illinois, but made weekly visits to St. Louis for the purpose of directing musical societies. The Alton public had brought before them many of the leading orchestras, soloists and best musical talent of all countries through the influence of Rohland.

Personal life and family

Sadie Kuttner Epstein was the wife of Abraham I. Epstein (1858-1929), of the Beethoven Conservatory, with whom, from 1879 to 1924, as organist and choirmaster of St. John's Methodist Church and the Temple Shaari Emeth, she sang many years. Epstein, in addition to conservatory work, directed these two church choirs for more than twenty years, both of which were known for their remarkable aggregation of good singers. 

Two of the representative musicians of St. Louis are Marcus I. Epstein (1855-1947) and Abraham I. Epstein, who gained a national reputation as players of duets on the piano. The Epsteins were an exceptionally talented family. Herman Epstein was equally distinguished as a pianist. They were all Native Americans — born in Mobile, Alabama, the sons of Rabbi Isaac Epstein. 

Abraham Epstein studied with Eugène Prévost and other masters, devoting himself mainly to teaching piano, organ and composition lessons. He often did concerts to good advantage, and wrote a concerto for orchestra and piano, also composed considerable church music. By Mariana Brandt and other famous vocalists he was pronounced one of the most skillful of accompanists. 

The Epsteins lived at 4316 Lindell, and had two daughters, Marian Epstein Goldstein (1905-1985) and Janet Epstein Mendelson (1909-2005), who were also talented in music. 

She died on May 28, 1973, and is buried at New Mount Sinai Cemetery, Affton, Missouri.

References

1883 births
1973 deaths
People from Cincinnati
People from St. Louis
20th-century American singers